The 2016–17 Texas A&M–Corpus Christi Islanders men's basketball team represented Texas A&M University–Corpus Christi in the 2016–17 NCAA Division I men's basketball season. Led by head coach Willis Wilson, in his sixth season at Texas A&M–Corpus Christi, the Islanders were members of the Southland Conference and played their home games at the American Bank Center and the Dugan Wellness Center. They finished the season 24–12, 12–6 in Southland play to finish in a three-way tie for second place. They defeated Stephen F. Austin to advance to the championship game of the Southland tournament where they lost to New Orleans. They were invited to the CollegeInsider.com Tournament where they defeated Georgia State, Weber State, Fort Wayne and UMBC to advance to the championship game where they lost to Saint Peter's.

Previous season
The Islanders finished the 2015–16 season 25–8, 15–3 in Southland play to finish in second place. They defeated Sam Houston State to advance to the championship game of the Southland tournament where they lost to Stephen F. Austin. They received an invite to the CollegeInsider.com Tournament where they lost in the first round to Louisiana–Lafayette.

Media
Texas A&M–Corpus Christi men's basketball airs on KKTX with Steven King on the call all season long. Video streaming of all non-televised home games is available at GoIslanders.com.

Roster

Schedule and results

|-
!colspan=9 style=| Exhibition

|-
!colspan=9 style=| Non-conference regular season

|-
|-
!colspan=9 style=|Southland regular season 

|-
!colspan=9 style=| Southland tournament

|-
!colspan=9 style=| CIT

See also
2016–17 Texas A&M–Corpus Christi Islanders women's basketball team

References

Texas A&M–Corpus Christi Islanders men's basketball seasons
Texas AandM-Corpus Christi
Texas AandM-Corpus Christi
Texas AandM-Corpus Christi Islanders basketball
Texas AandM-Corpus Christi Islanders basketball